Joël Abu Hanna (born 22 January 1998) is a professional footballer who plays as a centre-back for Polish club Lechia Gdańsk, on loan from Legia Warsaw. Born in Germany, he represents the Israel national team.

Early life
Abu Hanna was born in Troisdorf, Germany, to an Arab-Israeli Christian father and a German Christian mother.

International career
Abu Hanna was a youth international for the Germany's U17, U18, and U19 teams.

Prior to his decision to play for the senior Israel national team, Abu Hanna was also considered to play for the senior Palestine national team.

In his first official match playing for Israel versus Czech Republic at the 2020–21 UEFA Nations League, Abu Hanna accidentally scored an own goal.

References

External links
 
 
 
 Football Palestine

1998 births
Living people
Israeli footballers
Israel international footballers
German footballers
Germany youth international footballers
People from Troisdorf
Sportspeople from Cologne (region)
German Christians
Israeli Arab Christians
Arab-Israeli footballers
Arab citizens of Israel
Footballers from North Rhine-Westphalia
Association football defenders
Bayer 04 Leverkusen players
1. FC Kaiserslautern II players
1. FC Kaiserslautern players
1. FC Magdeburg players
SC Fortuna Köln players
FC Zorya Luhansk players
Legia Warsaw players
Legia Warsaw II players
Lechia Gdańsk players
2. Bundesliga players
3. Liga players
Ukrainian Premier League players
Ekstraklasa players
III liga players
Israeli expatriate footballers
Expatriate footballers in Ukraine
Expatriate footballers in Poland
Israeli expatriate sportspeople in Ukraine
Israeli expatriate sportspeople in Poland
German people of Israeli descent
German people of Palestinian descent
People with acquired Israeli citizenship
Israeli people of German descent